Acrocercops nitidula is a moth of the family Gracillariidae, known from West Bengal, India. It was described by Henry Tibbats Stainton in 1919.

References

nitidula
Moths of Asia
Moths described in 1862